The New Flyer Xcelsior is a line of transit buses available in 35-foot rigid, 40-foot rigid, and 60-foot articulated nominal lengths manufactured by New Flyer Industries since 2008. In addition to the different available lengths, the buses are sold with a variety of propulsion systems: conventional diesel, compressed natural gas (CNG), diesel-electric hybrid, hydrogen fuel cell, overhead electric wire and battery electric. A future autonomous bus variant was announced in January 2021.

Model codes

For example, a New Flyer XE40 NG is a 40-foot (nominal) rigid Next Generation Xcelsior with battery-electric power, or an XN60 is a 60-foot articulated Original Generation Xcelsior with CNG power.

History 
The Xcelsior was introduced October 2008 APTA Expo held in San Diego. The Xcelsior started off as a set of improvements to the company's prior product, the New Flyer Low Floor, but over the development process the company said it ended up designing a new bus. Compared to the Low Flyer, the Xcelsior was 10% lighter, boosting fuel economy by about 7%.

The bus was also designed to allow a much larger cooling system and the addition of a SCR system, both required to meet the more stringent EPA mandates that were coming in 2010. To accommodate the change, the Thermo King air conditioning system was moved from the rear of the bus to a roof mount location over the front axle. New Flyer found that the move improved the weight balance of the bus, and when combined with enhanced insulation, contributed to the vehicle running quieter.

The interior of the bus was also modified. By moving the fuel tank and modifying the rear suspension, seating capacity was increased from 39 to 42 (on the 40-foot model), with more forward-facing seats. To improve interior aesthetics, visible fasteners were eliminated and molded plastic surfaces were introduced. The utilitarian instrument panel was replaced with an automotive-style electronic dashboard.

The bus also had a redesigned front face, bumpers, and roof shrouds that also offered better aerodynamics and the front improved visibility for the driver.

At launch, the Xcelsior was only available in a  length with power from the Cummins ISL 280 and a Allison B400 conventional transmission or the Allison EP-40 hybrid drive. Brampton Transit, serving Brampton, Ontario, was the first agency to order the Xcelsior.

The first trolleybus version of the Xcelsior was an XT40 built in 2014 for the Seattle trolleybus system, operated by King County Metro, the first unit of an order placed in 2013. King County Metro also purchased the XT60 (articulated trolleybus), and both XT40s and XT60s were subsequently purchased by the San Francisco Municipal Railway, for the San Francisco trolleybus system.

Xcelsior CHARGE

The first Xcelsior battery electric buses (XE40) were built in 2014 and delivered to the Chicago Transit Authority and Winnipeg Transit. Massachusetts Bay Transportation Authority was the lead agency for the XE60, ordered in January 2019 and placed into service on July 31, 2019. The Toronto Transit Commission operates 25 XE40 buses.

The first battery-electric Xcelsior buses were a powertrain option within the regular Xcelsior line; development was announced in 2011, a prototype was shown in 2012, and regular production began in 2014. The original battery-electric Xcelsior bus, offered as an XE40, used a permanent magnet traction motor built by Siemens. In October 2017, the Xcelsior CHARGE sub-line was introduced.

The Xcelsior CHARGE variant (XEnn) uses the Siemens ELFA2 electric drive system with different options for battery capacity, depending on the charging speed and range required. Batteries are supplied by XALT Energy or A123 Systems (XE60 long-range models and XHEnn fuel cell models). On-route rapid charging is provided through an overhead pantograph designed to be interoperable with the SAE J3105 standard supplying 300–450 kW. Shop or depot charging may be performed using SAE J3068 and J1772 connectors supplying up to 150 kW.

It was equipped with 4 XALT Xsyst 7 (7 kWh) batteries and a SPHEROS fuel-fired heater. When accelerating from a constant speed, the bus emitted an average maximum noise level of 66.1 dB(A), considerably lower than the average maximum noise level of 70.4 dB(A) measured from a conventionally-powered XD40.

Xcelsior CHARGE NG 
Xcelsior CHARGE NG is New Flyer's next generation battery-electric, zero-emission bus. It is lighter, simpler and has longer range with better energy recovery. It has a capacity of 32-61 passengers with 2 wheelchair locations. It is available in 35-, 40-, and 60-foot configurations. It has a Siemens ELFA3 traction motor, Lithium Manganese Cobalt (NMC) batteries, and electric roof-mounted HVAC(s).

XE60

The articulated XE60 adds a second driven axle, using the ZF AxTrax AVE on the middle axle. Each motor is an asynchronous three-phase AC motor operating on 650 VDC with an input current of 250 (continuous) to 340 (peak) amps, using a single-speed reduction gear ratio of 22.66:1. The complete axle assembly weighs 

Compared to the diesel-powered equivalent XD60, the XE60 is heavier (XD60 GVW is ) and holds slightly fewer people (XD60 capacity is 123 people: 49 seated, 73 standing, 1 driver).

The MBTA and NYMTA were the first to order the XE60, with the former ordering 5 and the latter ordering 15.

Xcelsior CHARGE H2
The CHARGE model can be equipped with a hydrogen fuel cell (model code XHE), which acts as an on-board charger to extend range. Earlier New Flyer fuel cell buses were based on the preceding Low Floor chassis, designated H40LFR, and integrated by an outside vendor. In 2016, New Flyer received an order for 25 XHE40 buses under the California Air Resources Board Air Quality Improvement Program (AQIP). The XHE40 uses a MAN SE model 1350 rear axle with a traction motor from Siemens; like the XE60, the XHE60 also uses a MAN 1350 rear axle as a pusher, but adds a ZF AxTrax AVE middle axle as a puller for traction-challenged conditions.

The fuel cell was a Ballard HD85 with an 85 kW output.

Development of the electric fuel cell buses is centered in California, with AC Transit serving as the lead agency for one XHE60, and SunLine Transit Agency, AC Transit, and Orange County Transportation Authority testing several variants of XHE40.

Xcelsior AV
New Flyer and Robotic Research announced a partnership in May 2019 to develop automated bus technology. In January 2021, New Flyer introduced the Xcelsior AV, New Flyer's first ever autonomous bus. New Flyer claims the AV meets the SAE J3016 Level 4 of autonomy. The AV is based on the XE40 chassis, and uses Robotic Research's AutoDrive suite of sensors and AutoDrive ByWire mechanical actuators. Project management was performed by The Center for Transportation and Environment (CTE) with support from the Federal Transit Administration, who provided a  million grant under the Integrated Mobility Innovation Program.

The deployment on a BRT line is anticipated to test the vehicles' ability to perform precision docking at station platforms and platooning multiple vehicles.

Gallery

See also
 BYD K9
ENC Axess
 Gillig Low Floor
 Nova Bus LFS
 Proterra Catalyst and Proterra ZX5

References

External links
 
 
Xcelsior NG:  https://www.newflyer.com/bus/xcelsior-charge-ng/

Brochures
 Xcelsior family overview
 Xcelsior AV
 Xcelsior CHARGE H2
 Xcelsior CHARGE NG
 Xcelsior Clean Diesel
 Xcelsior CNG
 Xcelsior Hybrid-Electric
 Xcelsior Trolley-Electric

Buses of Canada
Buses of the United States
Xcelsior
Vehicles introduced in 2008
Articulated buses
Fuel cell buses
Battery electric buses